Whitewood is a town in the Canadian province of Saskatchewan. It is situated at the crossroads of two major highways systems – the Trans-Canada, which runs east and west, and Sk Hwy 9, which runs north and south from the US border to Hudson Bay, Saskatchewan. Located midway between Brandon, Manitoba and Regina, Whitewood was and continues to be an ideal place to stop and rest.

It is administrative headquarters of the First Nations band governments of the Ochapowace and the Chachacas Cree.

History 
Where Whitewood now stands was once grasslands, travelled only by nomadic First Nations people, white traders, trappers and buffalo hunters.  Native plants and wildlife thrived in perfect balance.  The people who followed the trails between the Valley of the Qu'Appelle and the Pipestone Creek left no more permanent marks on the landscape than the tracks of their Red River carts.

Before the settlement of the west, Whitewood began as a crossing of trails between the Qu'Appelle Valley to the north and the Moose Mountains to the south.  The Hudson's Bay Company trading post was established about the fall of 1891 to approximately the spring of 1906.

With the settlement of the west and the coming of the Trans-Continental railway, Whitewood quickly grew into a thriving community.  The CPR naming was derived from the White Poplar (Populus alba), a deciduous tree with white bark, which was plentiful in the area.

By 1882, the town of Whitewood, Provisional District of Assiniboia, North-West Territories was a major stop on the Canadian Pacific Railway.  The town grew steadily from that time and was incorporated as a town in 1892. An interesting note is that while the Town Seal has "Incorporated 1893" on it the actual incorporation took place on 30 December 1892.

Settlers from many lands came to the area and the multi-national character of the community is seen in the names of the residents to this day.  The first Finnish settlement in the west, New Finland is located here, and Hungarians, Swedes, Germans, Poles, Russians, Czechs, English, Scottish and Irish, also made Whitewood their destination in the new world. To quote a prominent writer of that period, and resident of Whitewood John Hawkes, "Whitewood was in the eighties (1880s) the most cosmopolitan point in the west.  It came to be a saying that one should know eleven languages to do business in Whitewood." Hawkes penned Saskatchewan and Its People in three volumes.

One of the most unusual and glamorous settlements was that of the French Counts of St Hubert, Saskatchewan. Headed by the educated Dr Rudolph Meyer, this group of Belgian and French aristocrats aimed to build a life on the Canadian prairies in the style of the French nobility in Europe. Annually the Counts booked the Whitewood Commercial Hotel for the Frenchman's Ball.  "Many pretty dresses of the style of the late eighties were in evidence, souvenirs perhaps of better days across the sea. The vivacious Frenchwomen of gentle birth and breeding in fashionable décolleté gowns and jeweled neck and arms lent an air of distinction in spite of the incongruity of the crude setting".

Remains of this settlement still exist and many residents of the community are proud of their connection to the Most Romantic Settlement in the West.

Geography 
Whitewood is located in the north eastern section of the topographical area named Wood Hills to the north of Moose Mountain and south of the Qu'Appelle River. Whitewood is situated in the Melville Plain of the Aspen Parkland ecoregion.

Burrows, Clayridge, Forest Farm, St. Luke, and St. Hubert Mission are small unincorporated areas near Whitewood.  The Ochapowace (Ochapowace) Indian Reserve is nearby.

Climate 
Whitewood has a humid continental climate, with extreme seasonal temperatures. Annually, temperatures exceed  on an average in late July Typically, summer lasts from late June until late August, and the humidity is seldom uncomfortably high. Winter lasts from November to March, and varies greatly in length and severity. Spring and autumn are both short and highly variable.

Demographics 

Government 

The town of Whitewood has a mayor as the highest ranking government official. The town also elects aldermen or councillors to form the municipal council.  Currently the mayor is Rhett Parks, and is serving with councillors Donna Beutler, Chad Kelly, Chris Ashfield, Brian Waynert, Glenn Mantai, and Brent Schaan.  The town administrator is Lisa Istace.

Provincially, Whitewood is within the constituency of Moosomin served by their Member of legislative assembly, the honourable Stephen Bonk.

Federally, the Souris--Moose Mountain riding is represented by their Member of Parliament, Robert Kitchen.

As Whitewood has achieved town status, it has its own municipal government, however rural governments nearby are Willowdale No. 153 and Silverwood No. 123.

Economy 
Economically, Whitewood is situated in the Yorkton—Melville economic region. Whitewood along with Broadview, Grenfell, Wolseley are all part of the Mainline Regional Economic Development Authority.  REDA's stimulate economic growth in the local area as they are familiar with the inherent needs of the community and stimulate business and government investment resulting in job creation, tourism and recreational facilities.

Infrastructure

Transportation 
Whitewood Airport , is located adjacent to Whitewood. Whitewood was established in the late 19th century on the Canadian Pacific Railway Trans-Continental railway.  Currently, Whitewood is situated at the crossroads of two major highways systems – the Trans-Canada Highway Sk Hwy 1, which runs east and west, and Sk Hwy 9, which runs north and south from the US border to Hudson Bay, Saskatchewan.

Media 
The Herald Sun is a weekly newspaper. Operating as the Whitewood Herald until 2015, the newspaper has been publishing since 1892, making it one of the oldest weekly newspapers in the province. John Hawkes was the editor of the Whitewood Herald from 1897 to 1900. Since 1955, the newspaper has been owned and operated by three different generations of the Ashfield family. The current owner and publisher of the Herald Sun is Chris Ashfield, who is a fourth generation publisher. He owns and operates Grasslands News which also publishes the Melville Advance and Fort Qu’Appelle Times.

Museums and other points of interest 
During Whitewood's centennial year of 1992, they collaborated on the history of the French Counts.  The Merchant Bank Heritage Center soon followed which also celebrates the French Count history and displays the welcoming sign "The Most
Romantic Settlement in the West."

In the fall of 2002, economic development director Janet Blackstock along with Mayor Malcolm Green aimed to restore the homes built in the late 19th century by the French aristocrats and paint outside murals in Whitewood to re-vitalize the local history.  One mural was painted in 2000 showing the town in 1890.  The area of Whitewood claims that during the late 19th century, there were more aristocrats here than anywhere else in North America.

Location

Notes

External links 

 
Towns in Saskatchewan
Hudson's Bay Company trading posts
Division No. 5, Saskatchewan